A garrison ration (or mess ration for food rations of this type) is a type of military ration. Usually distinct from field rations, the term has varying meanings, but generally refers to either rations issued to personnel at a camp, installation, or other garrison; allowance allotted to personnel to purchase goods or rations sold in a garrison (or the rations purchased with said allowance); or a type of issued ration.

In some instances, what determines a ration to be a garrison ration depends on situational context. For example, a 1941 United States Army Field Manual defines a "garrison ration" as rations purchased with allowance in peacetime, with a "field ration" being rations issued in wartime or other special circumstances at no cost to those distributing or receiving them.

The term is often used in a historical context, but modern equivalents to garrison rations exist, though official use of the term in a present-day context is rare.

Wehrmacht 
German rations were issued on a scale according to the duties and locations of the troops, there were 4 scales of ration:

Ration I (Verpflegungssatz I) is for troops committed to combat, for those that are recuperating from combat, and for troops stationed in Norway north of 66° N. Latitude.

Ration II (Verpflegungssatz II) is for occupation and line-of-communication troops.

Ration III (Verpflegungssatz III) is for garrison troops within Germany.

Ration IV (Verpflegungssatz IV) goes to office workers and nurses within Germany.

United Kingdom 
In 1689 the first Royal warrant was published concerning the messing provisions for troops. The Commissary General was authorised to issue rations on a repayment basis. The ration was two-thirds of a pound (302 g) of bread and two-thirds of a pound of meat. fourpence (4d) was deducted daily from the soldiers' pay.

As there were no barracks at the time, soldiers were billeted on inn-keepers. The inn-keepers would receive fourpence to provide meals to the billeted soldiers.

In 1792 barracks for soldiers were introduced and soldiers were given 1½d a day for bread.

In 1795 allowances for bread and necessities were consolidated to 2¼d per day and was later increased in the year by 1½d per day to reflect increased prices of bread and meat.

From 1815 to 1854 the daily ration for a British soldier in the United Kingdom was 1 pound of bread (453 g) and ¾ of a pound of meat (340 g). Two meals were provided, breakfast at 7.30 a.m. and dinner at 12.30 p.m.

In the West Indies troops were issued with salt beef on five days with fresh meat being issued for two days a week.

Crimean War 
Following initial disasters in the supply system, reforms were made and British troops were issued the following; 24 oz (680 g) of bread, 16 oz (453 g) meat, 2 oz (56 g) Rice, 2 oz (56 g) Sugar, 3 oz (85 g) Coffee, 1 Gill (0.118l) spirits and ½ oz (14 g) salt.

First World War 
During the First World War British troops were issued the following daily ration; 1¼ pound (567 g) of meat, 1 pound (453 g) preserved meat, 1¼ (567 g) pound of bread, (or 1 pound (453 g) of biscuit and 4 oz (113 g) of bacon), 4 oz (113 g) Jam, 3 oz (85 g) sugar, ⅝ oz (17 g) tea, 8 oz (226 g) vegetables and 2 oz (56 g) of butter (weekly)

Horse Rations 
As horses were a principal form of transport for the British Army, horses also had a scale of rations issued.

Inter-war years 
In 1921 the Treasury accepted that the public should be responsible for rations and the first ration scale was approved. The daily ration scale was;

12 oz (340 g) Meat, 16 oz (453 g) bread and 2 oz (56 g) of bacon.

Second World War 
British troops in the United Kingdom had a ration scale set with different scales of rations for male and female soldiers. The daily ration scale in September 1941 was as follows;

Modern

UK MOD Nutrition Policy Statement 
Joint Service Publication (JSP) 456 Part 2 Volume 1 of December 2014, the Ministry of Defence policy on nutrition is as follows;

United Kingdom Armed Forces Food Based Standards

Mandatory food

Restricted food

Prohibited food

Daily Messing Rate 
The Daily Messing Rate (DMR) is used to provide the following daily calorific intake;

The current Daily Messing Rate is;

 £2.73 in the United Kingdom
 £3.60 outside the United Kingdom

Catering for diversity 
In accordance with current UK legislation and Government guidelines it is incumbent on the Armed Forces to cater for all personnel irrespective of gender, race, religious belief, medical requirements and committed lifestyle choices.

United States
During the American Revolution, the Continental Congress regulated garrison rations, stipulating in the Militia Law of 1775 that they should consist of:

One pound of beef, or 3/4 of a pound of pork or one pound of fish, per day. One pound of bread or flour per day. Three pints of peas or beans per week, or vegetables equivalent, at one dollar per bushel for peas or beans. One pint of milk per man per day. One half-pint of rice, or one pint of Indian meal per man per week. One quart of spruce beer, or cider, per man per day, or nine gallons of mollasses per company of one hundred men per week. Three pounds of candles to one hundred men per week, for guards. Twenty pounds of soft, or eight pounds of hard, soap for one hundred men per week.

These proportions changed fairly little until the American Civil War, although the exact contents varied somewhat. In 1863, potatoes were added to the ration at a rate of thirty pounds per hundred rations. The development of early nutrition science in the late 19th century led to changes to rations in 1892 that emphasized a more diverse selection of vegetables in addition to meat and potatoes. The principles behind the garrison ration came under fire after the Spanish–American War, as the long distance between American supply chains and troops fighting in Cuba, Puerto Rico and especially the Philippines left soldiers eating rotten foods and subsisting on canned goods that were made to very poor standards. The American death toll from bad food in that war exceeded combat fatalities.

By World War I, the American garrison ration had improved dramatically, including 137 grams of protein, 129 grams of fat, and 539 grams of carbohydrate every day, with a total of roughly 4,000 calories. However, fresh vegetables were largely absent, and the ration was inadequate in terms of vitamins. Further advances in nutrition led to the replacement of the garrison ration in 1933 with the New Army ration, which ultimately developed into the rations system described at United States military ration.

Since the WWII-era, A-rations and B-rations have been provided as part of garrison rations.

Currently garrison rations include the Unitized Group Ration and the Navy Standard Core Menu. They are prepared in dining facilities and mess halls use a standard pounds per hundred sheet for all meats. They also have standard recipe cards are follow guidelines under TB MED530 for compliance standards.

See also
 Mess
 Mess kit

References

External links
Fresh Foods for the Army, 1775-1950 - Information on US Army ration history at the Quartermaster Museum
 Operational Rations of the Department of Defense, 7th Edition

Military food